Jamuna Future Park is a shopping mall in Dhaka, Bangladesh. It was inaugurated on 6 September 2013. Construction began in 2002, by Jamuna Builders Ltd., a subsidiary of the Jamuna Group and the exterior was completed in 2008.
It is the biggest shopping mall in South Asia, and the 24th biggest mall in the world.

Location
The complex is spread across  of land in Kuril, Baridhara, situated on the Pragati Sharani, neighboring upper class residential areas of Dhaka city like Gulshan, Banani and Bashundhara. It is relatively close to Shahjalal International Airport, offices of multinational companies, major embassies and other offices.

It can be accessed by the Kuril Flyover, which opened in August 2013, from both directions of the Airport Road.

Structure
The centrally air-conditioned shopping complex has seven floors, equipped with its own 45MW power plant and WiFi internet. The lower basement and middle basement floor are reserved for car parking and a portion for a supermarket and a hypermarket. Level 1 is the base floor for all atria, facilities for live entertainment, musical and fashion shows. From the ground floor to the fifth floor, there are several categories of outlets, non-branded shops, banks, online booths and food courts.  The fifth floor has space for a children's theme park, a gymnasium and a health club, two separate swimming pools for men and women,  exhibition halls, banquet halls, international standard movie theater with seven individual halls, 22-lane bowling alley with karaoke facilities, and a musical and entertainment floor. JFP is also going to have Dhaka's second ice skating rink. The shopping mall is built with earth resistance as per Bangladesh National Building Code (BNBC) Zone 2.

Future projects include a 700-room JW Marriott Dhaka hotel and a mosque.

See also
List of shopping malls in Bangladesh
List of largest shopping malls in the world

References

External links

 

Jamuna Group
Shopping malls in Dhaka
Shopping malls established in 2013